Nashville Pussy is an American rock band from Atlanta, Georgia. Initially called Hell's Half-Acre, the band's name comes from Ted Nugent's introduction to "Wang Dang Sweet Poontang" on the Double Live Gonzo album.

Following the initial 1997 breakup of Kentucky cowpunk band Nine Pound Hammer, guitarist Blaine Cartwright formed Nashville Pussy where he would take up vocal duties in addition to guitar. The core lineup of Nashville Pussy consists of husband-and-wife duo Blaine Cartwright and Ruyter Suys (pronounced "Rider Sighs"), and drummer Jeremy Thompson, formerly of Texas band Phantom Creeps. Original drummer Adam Neal (Nine Pound Hammer) left to form the Hookers. Original bassist Corey Parks (sister of nine-season NBA basketball player Cherokee Parks) quit one month after the release of the album High as Hell, and later joined Die Hunns. Tracy Almazan a.k.a. Tracy Kickass formerly of New York City's The Wives, and Helldorado was enlisted to replace Parks mid-tour. 

Nashville Pussy recorded Say Something Nasty with Almazan on bass only to be replaced by Katielyn Campbell (of the band Famous Monsters). Katie Lynn's image is on the album Say Something Nasty. Campbell was subsequently replaced by Karen Cuda for the album Get Some. Karen Cuda also appeared as bassist on the album "From Hell to Texas", and in the live DVD Live in Hollywood.

Nashville Pussy have released seven full-length studio albums, one EP and two live DVDs.

Style
The band's influences include ZZ Top, Ted Nugent, The Isley Brothers, Betty Davis, Commodores, Funkadelic, Chuck Berry, Ramones and New York Dolls. Their musical style is a blend of psychobilly, southern rock, hard rock and punk rock. This style has been classified as shock rock, hard rock, thrash metal and southern rock. The band's lyrical themes mostly revolve around sex, drugs, drinking, fighting, and rock and roll.

Following
The band has remained largely underground, but has been gaining a large cult following in the rock club scene, and in Europe, Australia, Japan, France, and the rest of the world. Grassroots promotion of the band has been aided by their taper-friendly show recording policy.
Ruyter Suys was recently voted One of the Greatest Female Electric Guitarists in ELLE magazine. Nine Pound Hammer has since reunited and plays the introduction song for the Adult Swim cartoon 12 Oz. Mouse. Cartwright also had a cameo in the Mr. Show spinoff movie Run Ronnie Run as Duke's Bar Owner. The band also played themselves in the Dutch Film 'Wilde Mossels' (Wild Mussels).

Nashville Pussy received a Best Metal Performance Grammy nomination for their song "Fried Chicken and Coffee" from their debut release, Let Them Eat Pussy (1998, The Enclave) 1999 Grammy. Between April 2 to May 7, 1999, the band toured as the opening act for the North American leg of Marilyn Manson's Rock Is Dead Tour. Ruyter Suys was featured on National Enquirer TV along with Jennifer Lopez on the Grammy Red Carpet for her 'revealing' Evel Knievel meets Wonder Woman leather bustier in a feature titled 'Too Much Too Little' and their songs "Come On, Come On" and "Hate & Whisky" were featured in the video game Jackass: The Game. Additionally, "Snake Eyes" was for the end credits in the video game Rogue Trip: Vacation 2012 and both "Shoot First and Run Like Hell" and "Wrong Side of a Gun" were in the movie Super Troopers. The song 'DRIVE' with its Gary Glitter style drum beat was featured in the episode 'Watching Too Much Television' of the HBO series The Sopranos. HBO'S Entourage also featured Nashville Pussy's 'Hell Ain't What It Used to Be' in the episode 'A Day in the Valley'. In 2012 Ruyter Suys has also played guitar and toured for Atlanta comedy metal band Dick Delicious and the Tasty Testicles.

Lineup

Current members
 Blaine Cartwright – vocals, rhythm guitar
 Ruyter Suys – lead guitar
 Bonnie Buitrago – bass
 Ben Thomas – drums

Former members
 Adam Neal (a.k.a. The Rock N Roll Outlaw) – drums
 Corey Parks – bass
 Max Terasauro – drums
 Tracy Almazan (a.k.a. Tracy Wives, Tracy Kickass) – bass
 Katielyn Campbell – bass
 Karen Cuda – bass
 Jeremy Thompson – drums
 RL Hulsman – drums

Discography

Studio albums
 1998: Eat More Pussy EP
 1998: Let Them Eat Pussy
 2000: High as Hell
 2002: Say Something Nasty
 2005: Get Some!
 2009: From Hell to Texas
 2014: Up the Dosage
 2018: Pleased to Eat You

Live albums
 2003: Keep on f*cking Live in Paris (DVD)
 2008: Live in Hollywood (DVD)
 2011: Live in Rennes
 2012: Live and Loud from Europe (CD bonus from "From Hell to Texas – Reissued")
 2015: Live in Nothingham  (Cd bonus "10 Years Of Pussy")
 2020: Eaten Alive

Singles

"Come On, Come On" From The Album "Get Some!" (2005)
"Hate and Whisky" From The Album "Get Some!" (2005)
"From Hell to Texas" From The Album "From Hell To Texas (2009)
"Drunk Driving Man" From The Album "From Hell To Texas (2009)
"Why, Why, Why" From The Album "From Hell To Texas (2009)

References

External links

Video of Nashville Pussy playing at the Fox Theatre in Boulder, Colorado on Friday, January 11th, 2008 (entire set/show)

French site
CrashCam Films (CrashCam Films home page) – filmmaker Bob Ray's Austin, Texas based production company that created music videos for the Nashville Pussy songs "Fried Chicken and Coffee", "High as Hell" and "Say Something Nasty"
Karen Cuda interview at BassGirls.Com

Musical groups established in 1996
Musical groups from Atlanta
Musical quartets
American hard rock musical groups